Doug Anderson (born 1943) is an American poet, fiction writer, and memoirist. His most recent book is Horse Medicine (Barrow Street Books)
. He has written a memoir,'Keep Your Head Down: Vietnam, the Sixties, and a Journey of Self-Discovery (W.W. Norton, 2009). His honors include grants and fellowships from the National Endowment for the Arts, the Massachusetts Artists Foundation, the Massachusetts Cultural Council, Poets & Writers, and the MacDowell Colony. His work has appeared in Ploughshares, the Connecticut Review, The Massachusetts Review, Virginia Quarterly, The Southern Review, Field, and The Autumn House Anthology of American Poetry, as well as this year's Contemporary American War Poetry. He also published a play, Short Timers, which was produced in New York in 1981.

He served in Vietnam as a corpsman with a Marine infantry battalion in 1967. He graduated from the University of Arizona.  He worked in the theater, as an actor. He then settled in Northampton, Massachusetts, where he began to write plays and poems in a workshop with Jack Gilbert, and Linda Gregg. Anderson taught at the University of Connecticut, Eastern Connecticut State University, the William Joiner Center for the Study of War and Its Social Consequences, Mount Wachusett Community College and at a Massachusetts state prison. He is completing a book called Loose Cantos. In 2010 he began teaching in the Pacific University of Oregon MFA Program.  He is currently a lecturer in the Institute of Liberal Arts and Interdisciplinary Studies at Emerson College, Boston.

Honors and awards
 Pushcart Prize
 NEA grant
 Massachusetts Cultural Council Fellowship
 1995 Kate Tufts Discovery Award for The Moon Reflected FirePublished works
Full-length poetry collections
 
 
 

Chapbooks
 Cry Wolf (Azul Editions)

Anthology publications
 
 
 

Memoir
 Keep Your Head Down: Vietnam, The Sixties, and a Journey of Self-Discovery

Reviews
Joyce Peseroff writes that The Moon Reflected Fire is “not just about Vietnam but resonant with the history of warriors from the backyard to the Iliad to the Bible.Blues for Unemployed Secret Police, was praised by Booklist'' for its “powerful, funny-horrific, brutal-tender poems.”

References

External links
 Biography & Poems: The Poetry Center at Smith College > Featured Reader > Doug Anderson
 Audio: Doug Anderson Reading at the Sunken Garden Poetry Festival, August 25, 2001 Weekend Edition Saturday, NPR
 Essay: 
 Poem: The Poetry Foundation > Letter to Martín Espada by Doug Anderson
 

1943 births
Living people
Poets from Massachusetts
University of Arizona alumni
University of Connecticut faculty
United States Navy corpsmen
United States Navy personnel of the Vietnam War
Eastern Connecticut State University
Pacific University faculty
 Emerson College faculty